The 2009–10 Harvard Crimson women's ice hockey team represented Harvard University in the 2009–10 NCAA Division I women's hockey season. The team was coached by Katey Stone. Assisting Stone were Joakim Flygh, Melanie Ruzzi and Sara DeCosta. The Crimson captured the program's 13th Beanpot title and earned a berth in the NCAA quarterfinals. Games will be broadcast locally on 95.3 FM WHRB.

Offseason
July 10: A trio of former Harvard All-America skaters have been selected to attend the 2009 USA Hockey Women's National Festival. The festival will take place Aug. 18-24 in Blaine, Minnesota. The three former Harvard skaters are Caitlin Cahow, Julie Chu and Angela Ruggiero. They are among the 41 players who will participate at the festival. It will serve as the selection for the 2009-10 U.S. Women's National Team. The national squad will compete in the Qwest Tour that begins Sept. 25 and ends prior to the start of the 2010 Winter Olympics in Vancouver, B.C. The roster for the 2009-10 U.S. Women's National Team will be announced on August 24.
July 27: For the second consecutive year, several current and former members of the Harvard women's hockey team will raise money for breast cancer research. The members are competing at the Angela Ruggiero Chowder Cup Tournament, at the Foxboro Sports Center July 30-Aug. 2.
Among the Harvard members are: Caitlin Cahow, Kirsten Kester, Sarah Wilson, Kate Buesser, Ashley Wheeler, Jillian Dempsey, Josephine Pucci and Kaitlin Spurling. The team will wear pink uniforms during the tournament, donate time off the ice to take breast cancer research donations.
August 12: Harvard senior goaltender Christina Kessler made 25 saves to guide Canada's National Women's Under-22 Team to a 4-0 victory over Sweden at the under-22 selection camp at Father David Bauer Olympic Arena in Calgary, Alberta.
Sept 22: Harvard has been picked to finish second in ECAC Hockey, according to the coaches poll released by the conference. Goaltender Christina Kessler has been named to the ECAC Hockey Preseason All-Conference Team for the second consecutive season. Harvard claimed three first-place votes and 103 points in the poll, finishing second in the preseason poll to St. Lawrence.

Recruiting

Regular season
October 5: The Harvard women's hockey team was ranked No. 9 in the country. The USCHO.com officials revealed it in their first Top-10 Women's Hockey Poll of the season. Harvard accumulated 28 points.
November 7: The 10th-ranked Harvard women's ice hockey team had a 3-0 shutout victory over No. 7 St. Lawrence at Bright Hockey Center. The Crimson earned the program's 500th victory.
December 10: Seniors Cori Bassett and Anna McDonald and junior Kate Buesser have been selected to the ECAC Hockey All-Star Game roster. The all-star team will play the 2010 U.S. Women's National Team in an exhibition game Sunday, Jan. 2. 
December 17: Former Crimson skaters and All-Americans Caitlin Cahow ’07-08, Julie Chu ’06-07 and Angela Ruggiero ’02-04 are among 21 players named to the 2010 U.S. Olympic Women's Hockey Team.
December 22: Harvard alumnae Jennifer Botterill '02-03 and Sarah Vaillancourt '08-09 are among 21 players who have been selected to represent Canada's National Women's Hockey Team at the 2010 Olympic Winter Games in Vancouver, B.C.
February 9: Liza Ryabkina's second-period goal beat Northeastern 1-0, as Harvard claimed the Women's Beanpot. The Crimson prevailed in the Beanpot final for the ninth time in the last 12 years and for the 13th time overall. 
February 17: Four members of the Crimson are nominees for the  Patty Kazmaier Memorial Award. The nominees include: Christina Kessler, Kate Buesser, Liza Ryabkina and Leanna Coskren.
February 18: Junior forward Liza Ryabkina will be featured in the Feb. 22 edition of Sports Illustrated’s Faces in the Crowd column.
February 26: With a 5-1 victory over Princeton, Katey Stone became women's college hockey's all-time winningest coach, surpassing former Minnesota head coach Laura Halldorson.
March 4: Katie Buesser  has been named a finalist for the ECAC Player of the Year Award.

Roster

Player stats

Skaters

Goaltenders

Postseason
On March 13, 2010, the Cornell Big Red women's ice hockey program defeated the Crimson by a score of 6-2 to earn its first ever trip to the NCAA Frozen Four.

Awards and honors
Laura Bellamy, Bertagna Award (Beanpot's top goaltender)
Kate Buesser, ECAC Offensive Player of the Week (Week of November 16)
Kate Buesser, New England Hockey Writers All-Star Team
Jillian Dempsey, ECAC Rookie of the Week (Week of November 16)
Jillian Dempsey, Harvard, 2010 ECAC All-Rookie Team
Randi Griffin, ECAC Offensive Player of the Week (Week of February 22)
Christina Kessler, Pre-Season All-ECAC Team
Anna McDonald, Frozen Four Skills Competition participant
Liza Ryabkina, Beanpot Most Valuable Player

All-Ivy honors
Cori Bassett, Senior, Defense, 2010 Honorable Mention 
Kate Buesser, Forward, Junior, 2010 First Team All-Ivy
Leanna Coskren, Defense, Junior, 2010 Second Team All-Ivy
Jillian Dempsey, Forward, Freshman, 2010 Second Team All-Ivy
Christina Kessler, Goaltender, Senior, 2010 Honorable Mention

See also
2009–10 NCAA Division I women's ice hockey season

References

External links
Official Site

Harvard Crimson women's ice hockey seasons
Harvard
Har
Harvard Crimson women's ice hockey
Harvard Crimson women's ice hockey
Harvard Crimson women's ice hockey
Harvard Crimson women's ice hockey